Clemens Fandrich (born 10 January 1991) is a German professional footballer who plays as an attacking midfielder for Rot-Weiss Essen.

Career 
In 2013, Fandrich left his hometown club Energie Cottbus to sign for RB Leipzig for a fee of €80,000.

In June 2015, Fandrich left RB Leipzig, signing for Swiss Super League side FC Luzern. However, in the summer of 2016, Fandrich signed for Erzgebirge Aue from FC Luzern on a free transfer.

References

External links

Living people
1991 births
Sportspeople from Cottbus
German footballers
Footballers from Brandenburg
Association football midfielders
2. Bundesliga players
3. Liga players
FC Energie Cottbus II players
FC Energie Cottbus players
RB Leipzig players
FC Erzgebirge Aue players
Rot-Weiss Essen players
German expatriate footballers
German expatriate sportspeople in Switzerland
Expatriate footballers in Switzerland